Dryophthorini is a tribe of weevil and typical of the subfamily Dryophthorinae.

Genera
Wikispecies lists the following confirmed genera:
 Dryophthorus
 Psilodryophthorus
 Stenommatus
 †Lithophthorus

References

External links
 

Curculionidae genera
Dryophthorinae
Polyphaga tribes